Norosí is a town and municipality located in the Bolívar Department, northern Colombia. The municipality was established in 2007.

Municipalities of Bolívar Department